Brachyphaea is a genus of African corinnid sac spiders first described by W. Bösenberg & Heinrich Lenz in 1895.

Species
 it contains seven species:
Brachyphaea berlandi Lessert, 1915 – East Africa
Brachyphaea castanea Simon, 1896 – Tanzania (Zanzibar)
Brachyphaea hulli Lessert, 1921 – East Africa
Brachyphaea proxima Lessert, 1921 – East Africa
Brachyphaea simoni Simon, 1895 (type) – East Africa
Brachyphaea simpliciaculeata Caporiacco, 1949 – Kenya
Brachyphaea vulpina Simon, 1896 – Mozambique

References

Araneomorphae genera
Corinnidae
Spiders of Africa